Fowey Consols mine is a group of mines in the St Blazey district of Cornwall. They were owned by wealthy Cornishman, Joseph Treffry. The mines were worked by 6 steam engines and 17 waterwheels. The mines were linked to the port at Par by a canal.  It was one of the deepest, richest and most important copper mines in Cornwall.

In 1813, these mines, then called Wheal Treasure, Wheal Fortune, and Wheal Chance, commenced working, and stopped in 1819. In 1822, they were purchased by Treffry, and consolidated under the above title. In 1836, Lanescot mine was added to the Fowey Consols.

Minerals
Fowey Consols is the type locality for two minerals - Langite and Rhabdophane-(Ce), and a total of 34 valid minerals have been reported from the Consols.

References

 Richly Yielding Piece of Ground: History of Fowey Consols Mine 1813 to 1867 Jim Lewis 
 History of Copper Mining in Cornwall & Devon, D. Bradford Barton

External links

 Cornwall in Focus page on Fowey Consols
 Timeline on the history of the mine

Copper mines in Cornwall
Industrial archaeological sites in Cornwall